Michael Toch (born 1946) is professor of medieval history at the Hebrew University of Jerusalem. He specialises in the history of the Jews in the Middle Ages, the early modern history of Germany and Europe, the social and economic history of medieval Germany, the history of farmers and agriculture, and the history of technology and communication.

Early life
Michael Toch was born in London in 1946. His family returned to Austria in 1948 where Toch received his basic education. In 1964, he moved to Kibbutz Magen, Israel. From 1965 to 1969 he completed his military service, and from 1969 to 1975 he studied history, philosophy and sociology at the Hebrew University of Jerusalem.

Career
From 1974 to 1975, Toch was tutor in history at Ben-Gurion University, Beer-Sheva. He completed his PhD thesis on "The Middle Classes of Nuremberg in the 15th Century" at Erlangen University in Germany which was awarded in 1978. He lectured in history at the Hebrew University before becoming Alexander von Humboldt-Research Fellow at Monumenta Germaniae Historica, Munich. From 1986 he was a senior lecturer in medieval history at the Hebrew University and associate professor in medieval history there from 1992, and full professor from 1998.

A leading medieval historian, Toch's research focuses on the history of the Jews in the Middle Ages, the early modern history of Germany and Europe, the social and economic history of medieval Germany, the history of farmers and agriculture, and the history of technology and communication.

Selected publications
 Die Nürnberger Mittelschichten im 15. Jahrhundert. Nürnberg, 1978. 
 Die Juden im mittelalterlichen Reich. München, 1998. 
 Peasants and Jews in medieval Germany. Studies in cultural, social and economic history. Ashgate, 2003. (Variorum Collected Studies) 
 Wirtschaftsgeschichte der mittelalterlichen Juden. Fragen und Einschätzungen. München, 2008.  (Rezension)
 The Economic History of European Jews: Late Antiquity and Early Middle Ages. Brill, Leiden, 2012.

References

External links 
Michael Toch at academia.edu
The Economic History of European Jews: Late Antiquity and Early Middle Ages by Prof. Michael Toch.
The Economic History of European Jews.

1946 births
Living people
Israeli medievalists
Jewish historians
Israeli historians
Hebrew University of Jerusalem alumni
Academic staff of the Hebrew University of Jerusalem
Erlangen University alumni
Israeli people of Austrian-Jewish descent
British emigrants to Austria